Jaled el Masri is a citizen of Syria who was subjected to the American program of extraordinary rendition and held in extrajudicial detention in the CIA's network of black sites.
Jaled el Masri is reported to have been apprehended by a clandestine CIA team in January 2004, in Skopje, Macedonia.
Jaled el Masri is reported to have been tortured by the CIA in Afghanistan.

The Boeing 737 airliner that transported Jaled el Masri and the CIA team landed in La Palma, Majorca, a Spanish Island in the Mediterranean.
In May 2010 Spanish authorities issued an arrest warrant for the CIA officials who landed in Spanish territory while accompanying Jaled el Masri.
The arrest warrants triggered concern in the United Kingdom because the CIA officials were reported to have used UK passports.

Mistaken Identity
Another man named Jaled el Masri was arrested in Skopje around the same time, on December 31, 2003.
He was a German citizen of Lebanese origins on vacation in the country, when was mistaken for a terrorist by Macedonian authorities. After being tortured, he was handed over to the CIA and spent six months being interrogated in an undisclosed location in Afghanistan. He was returned to Germany on May 28, 2004.

References

Year of birth missing (living people)
Living people